René Le Pays, sieur de Plessis-Villeneuve (Nantes or Fougères, 1636 - Paris, April 30, 1690), sometimes credited as M.L.C.D.P., was a French poet and tax farmer-general (fermier général des gabelles) in Dauphiné and Provence.

He was a founding member of the Academy of Arles in 1668, and the Duke of Savoy conferred on him the Order of St. Maurice in 1670.

Works

 Amitiés, Amours, et Amourettes, Grenoble 1664
 Zelotide histore galante, Paris 1665
 Translated as The drudge, or The jealous extravagant, a piece of gallantry by John Bulteel, 1673
 Nouvelles Œuvres, 1672 (2 vols.)
 Le Démélé de l'Esprit et du Cœur, 1688

Bibliography

 Biographie universelle, ancienne et moderne, ou Histoire, par ordre alphabétique, de la vie publique et privée de tous les hommes, ed. Michaud, 1811-1828 French Wikipedia Reference page, s.v. Le Pays (René)
 A General Biographical Dictionary, 2 s.v., drawn from Michaud

Notes

French poets
Writers from Nantes
17th-century French male writers
17th-century French poets
French male poets
1636 births
1690 deaths
Fermiers généraux